Marcel Bonin (10 November 1904 – 17 September 1980) was a French sports shooter. He competed at the 1936 Summer Olympics and 1948 Summer Olympics.

References

1904 births
1980 deaths
French male sport shooters
Olympic shooters of France
Shooters at the 1936 Summer Olympics
Shooters at the 1948 Summer Olympics
Sportspeople from Tours, France
20th-century French people